The 2015–16 FIS Cross-Country World Cup was the 35th official World Cup season in cross-country skiing for men and women. The season started on 27 November 2015 in Ruka, Finland, and ended on 12 March 2016 in Canmore, Alberta, Canada.

Therese Johaug set a new record for total points in one season, with 2681. Martin Johnsrud Sundby set a new men's record for total points in one season, with 2634. Sundby won 14 races during the season and surpassed Petter Northug's record of nine victories which he achieved in both 2009–10 and 2012–13. Johaug won 17 races during this season and equaled Marit Bjørgen's record from 2011–12; a record Johaug herself eclipsed with 20 victories in the 2019–20 season.

Calendar

Men

Women

Men's team

Women's team

Men's standings

Overall

Distance

Sprint

Prize money

Helvetia U23

Audi Quattro Bonus Ranking

Women's standings

Overall

Distance

Sprint

Prize money

Helvetia U23

Audi Quattro Bonus Ranking

Nations Cup

Overall

Men

Women

Achievements
New official FIS count from 2015/16 season. Only individual events.

First World Cup career victory

Men
  Sondre Turvoll Fossli, 22, in his 6th season – the WC 1 (Sprint C) in Kuusamo; first podium was 2014-15 WC 1 (Sprint C) in Ruka
  Niklas Dyrhaug, 28, in his 7th season – the WC 1 (15 km C Pursuit) in Ruka; also first podium
  Emil Iversen, 24, in his 3rd season – the WC 7 (Sprint C) in Oberstdorf; also first podium
  Baptiste Gros, 25, in his 6th season – the WC 17 (Sprint F) in Quebec City; first podium was 2013-14 WC 8 (Sprint F) in Szklarska Poręba

Women
  Stina Nilsson, 22, in her 5th season – the WC 4 (Sprint F) in Davos; first podium was 2013-14 WC 14 (Sprint C) in Drammen
  Sophie Caldwell, 25, in her 4th season – the WC 7 (Sprint C) in Oberstdorf; first podium was 2013-14 WC 12 (Sprint F) in Lahti
  Jessie Diggins, 24, in her 6th season – the WC 7 (5 km F) in Toblach; also first podium
  Heidi Weng, 24, in her 7th season – the WC 7 (10 km C Mass Start) in Val di Fiemme; first podium was 2011-12 WC 18 (15 km Skiathlon) in Lahti
  Krista Pärmäkoski, 25, in her 8th season – the WC 17 (10 km C Pursuit) in Canmore; first podium was 2010-11 WC 11 (10 km C Handicap start) in Oberhof

First World Cup podium

Men
  Niklas Dyrhaug, 28, in his 7th season – no. 1 in the WC 1 (15 km C Pursuit) in Ruka
  Hans Christer Holund, 26, in his 8th season – no. 3 in the WC 2 (30 km Skiathlon) in Lillehammer
  Andrew Young, 23, in his 8th season – no. 3 in the WC 5 (Sprint F) in Toblach
  Emil Iversen, 24, in his 3rd season – no. 1 in the WC 7 (Sprint C) in Oberstdorf
  Robin Duvillard, 32, in his 13th season – no. 2 in the WC 7 (9 km Pursuit climb) in Val di Fiemme

Women
  Jessie Diggins, 24, in her 6th season – no. 1 in the WC 7 (5 km F) in Toblach

Victories in this World Cup (all-time number of victories as of 2015/16 season in parentheses)

Men
  Martin Johnsrud Sundby, 14 (26) first places
  Federico Pellegrino, 5 (8) first places
  Sergey Ustiugov, 3 (4) first places
  Emil Iversen, 3 (3) first places
  Maurice Manificat, 2 (6) first places
  Petter Northug, 1 (36) first place
  Alexey Poltoranin, 1 (9) first place
  Maxim Vylegzhanin, 1 (7) first place
  Finn Hågen Krogh, 1 (7) first place
  Nikita Kryukov, 1 (5) first place
  Matti Heikkinen, 1 (3) first place
  Sondre Turvoll Fossli, 1 (1) first place
  Niklas Dyrhaug, 1 (1) first place
  Baptiste Gros, 1 (1) first place

Women
  Therese Johaug, 17 (42) first places
  Maiken Caspersen Falla, 8 (12) first places
  Stina Nilsson, 3 (3) first places
  Heidi Weng, 3 (3) first places
  Ingvild Flugstad Østberg, 2 (5) first places
  Sophie Caldwell, 1 (1) first place
  Jessie Diggins, 1 (1) first place
  Krista Pärmäkoski, 1 (1) first place

Retirements
Following are notable cross-country skiers who announced their retirement:

Men

Women

References

 
FIS Cross-Country World Cup seasons
2015 in cross-country skiing
2016 in cross-country skiing